Srećko Pejović (Serbian Cyrillic: Срећко Пејовић; born 5 July 1953), is a Serbian sport shooter who competed for Yugoslavia at the 1976, 1980 and 1988 Olympic Games. He achieved the best result in 1976 when he finished fourth in 50 m Rifle - Three positions.

External links
at  Sports-Reference
ISSF profile

1953 births
Serbian male sport shooters
Yugoslav male sport shooters
Shooters at the 1976 Summer Olympics
Shooters at the 1980 Summer Olympics
Shooters at the 1988 Summer Olympics
Olympic shooters of Yugoslavia
Living people